Cacostatia ossa is a moth of the subfamily Arctiinae. It was described by Herbert Druce in 1893. It is found in French Guiana, Guyana, and Colombia.

References

Arctiinae
Moths described in 1893